Sandhya (also known as Gaudesvara) was a king of Kamarupa kingdom in north-eastern India in the present-day state of Assam, India. He founded the Kamata Kingdom when he moved his capital west to Kamatapur (present-day Gosanimari) sometime after 1257 CE.
He became the ruler of Kamarupa in 1228, when Sultan Nasiruddin Mahmud Shah, who had earlier killed his predecessor Raja Prithu in 1228 AD, However, after Nasir-ud-din Mahmud withdrew from Kamrup, Sandhya stopped paying tribute and assumed independence.

In 1229, after the death of Nasiruddin, Sandhya drove the Muslims out of his territory and captured territory until Karatoya river. Thereafter, to avenge the previous defeats, he invaded the western border of Gaur (Lakhnauti) and annexed regions across the Karatoya into his kingdom. In retaliation, Malik Ikhtiyaruddin Yuzbak the governor of Gaur for the Mamluk rulers of Delhi, attempted an invasion on Sandhya's domain in 1257. However, Sandhya defeated the invasion attempt, captured and killed Malik Ikhtiyaruddin Yuzbak.

Subsequent to this attack, Sandhya moved his capital from Kamarupanagara (present-day North Guwahati) to Kamatapur in present-day Cooch Behar district and established a new kingdom, called the Kamata Kingdom.

Notes

References

 

History of Assam
Hindu monarchs
13th-century Indian monarchs
Kamarupa (former kingdom)